Yorkshire Rider was a bus company in West Yorkshire, England.

History
To comply with the Transport Act 1985, the West Yorkshire Passenger Transport Executive transferred its bus operations to an arms length company named Yorkshire Rider on 26 October 1986.

On 21 October 1988, Yorkshire Rider was privatised, being sold to a management buyout. In August 1989, Yorkshire Rider purchased West Yorkshire Road Car Company Leeds and Bradford garages, and associated routes, from AJS Group. In 1989, Yorkshire Rider was awarded a contract to operate the proposed Bradford trolleybus system, however the project was cancelled. 

In August 1990, the York businesses of Reynard Buses, Target Travel and York City & District were purchased, with operations merged together to form the subsidiary company Rider York. On 15 April 1994, Yorkshire Rider was purchased by Badgerline. It was included in the merger of Badgerline with GRT Group on 16 June 1995 to form FirstBus.

In September 1995, Yorkshire Rider was split into separate divisions:
Bradford Traveller: covering Bradford with a depot at Bowling Back Lane
Calderline: covering Halifax and Calderdale with depots in Halifax and Todmorden
Kingfisher Huddersfield: covering Kirklees with a depot at Old Fieldhouse Lane
Leeds City Link: covering the Leeds area with depots in Bramley, Hunslet and Cherry Row

In February 1998, all were renamed as First Bradford, First Calderdale, First Huddersfield and First Leeds as part of the rollout of the FirstGroup brand. Today these operate as First West Yorkshire and First York.

The Yorkshire Rider Social Club still exists in Leeds but no longer has formal connection with any bus operator. It also no longer receives any financial subsidy from such. It is one of the few remaining buildings where the Yorkshire Rider logo is still on display.

References

Former bus operators in West Yorkshire
Former PTE bus operators
Transport companies established in 1986
Transport companies disestablished in 1995
1986 establishments in England
1995 disestablishments in England